Cantharellus lilacinus is a species of fungus in the family Cantharellaceae. First described in 1919 by botanists John Burton Cleland and Edwin Cheel, the fungus is found in Australia.

References

External links
 

lilacinus
Fungi described in 1919
Fungi of Australia
Edible fungi
Taxa named by John Burton Cleland